William Sullivan (19 August 1877 – 29 August 1924) was an Australian cricketer. He played in one first-class match for Queensland in 1908/09.

See also
 List of Queensland first-class cricketers

References

External links
 

1877 births
1924 deaths
Australian cricketers
Queensland cricketers
Cricketers from Melbourne
People from North Melbourne